Triphasia brassii is a rare species of Triphasia in the family Rutaceae, native to New Guinea.

All known specimens are from one general area.  Triphasias are very close relatives of citrus.

Description 
It is a very spiny evergreen shrub (rarely a small tree) growing to 2 m (6.5 ft) tall. The leaves are glossy dark green, each leaflet 2–4 cm (3/4 to 1 1/2 in) long and 1.5–2 cm (3/4 to 1 in) wide. The flowers are white and strongly scented. The kumquat-sized fruit is a red, edible hesperidium resembling a small Citrus fruit.  The fruit is larger than the somewhat better known limeberry.  The fruit flesh is pulpy, with a flavor reminiscent of a slightly sweet lime.

Cultivation and uses 
Like its close relative the limeberry, T. brassii may have some unexplored potential as a fruit crop.  Thus far, however, this potential has been limited due to the absence of domesticated variants, the lack of close scientific study, and the extreme rarity of the plant.

References 

Berries
Aurantioideae
Tropical fruit

id:Kingkit